Howard Gregory Wright (born December 20, 1967) is an American former professional basketball player. Born in San Diego, California, he is a 6'8" (203 cm) 220 lb (100 kg) power forward and played collegiately at Stanford University from 1987 to 1989.

Wright played for the NBA's Dallas Mavericks, Atlanta Hawks, and Orlando Magic.  He also played in the Continental Basketball Association for the Tri-City Chinook.

References

External links
https://www.basketball-reference.com/players/w/wrighho02.html NBA stats] @ basketballreference.com

1967 births
Living people
21st-century African-American people
African-American basketball players
Alvark Tokyo players
American expatriate basketball people in France
American expatriate basketball people in Italy
American expatriate basketball people in Japan
American expatriate basketball people in Spain
American men's basketball players
Atlanta Hawks players
Basketball players from San Diego
BC Andorra players
Expatriate basketball people in Andorra
American expatriate basketball people in Andorra
CB Murcia players
Dallas Mavericks players
Joventut Badalona players
Liga ACB players
Orlando Magic players
Power forwards (basketball)
Reims Champagne Basket players
Small forwards
Stanford Cardinal men's basketball players
Tri-City Chinook players
Undrafted National Basketball Association players
20th-century African-American sportspeople